eDealinfo USA Inc. is in e-Commerce business of online deals and coupons for various consumer products and services. Headquarter of the company is at Indiana. eDealinfo USA Inc. operates its business through edealinfo.com, edealpc.com and unboxcoupons.com.

History
In the year 2000, Rajiv Maheshwari, the Founder/CEO/Web Designer, launched rajiv2000.tripod.com (no longer exists). In December 2000, domain edealinfo.com was purchased and the entire site was moved to this new domain. Later 2 more websites were launched that were focused on coupons ecouponsinfo.com (merged back with edealinfo.com in 2017) and computer system deals edealpc.com. Initially the company was located in the Detroit suburbs of Michigan. In 2015, Michigan passed the Sales and Use Tax Click-Through Nexus Law and the company decided to move to Indiana to avoid termination of affiliate contracts with various online retailers.

In 2017, ecouponsinfo.com was merged back with edealinfo.com. Also a brand new website unboxcoupons.com was launched with focus on coupons and vouchers for merchants outside of United States.

Awards and recognition

eDealinfo.com was listed in the "20+ tools for price watching and protecting" by CNET & in the "5 Things You Need to Know Before Using a Deals Website" by CheatSheet 
and was mentioned in 'Marketing your Udemy Course' by Udemy. The site was also mentioned in the popular books like "USA By Jeff Campbell" & "Worry-free Family Finances by Bill Staton & Mary Staton"

Product & services

The company help its customers by finding deals and coupons from online retailers worldwide for various products daily for different brands & categories.

References

Comparison shopping websites
Companies based in Indiana